Madukkarai is a suburb of Coimbatore city in the Indian state of Tamil Nadu.

Madukkarai may also refer to:

 Madukkarai Wall
 Madukkarai railway station
 Madukkarai Block
 Madukkarai taluk